Kham Keut (also Kham-Kert, Kham Keul) was a king of Lan Xang, and ruled from 1436 to 1438. He was the son of King Samsenethai, who had ruled from 1373 to 1416, and his mother was said to be a palace slave. On his accession to the throne in 1436, he claimed to be a reincarnation of his father. His reign was ended by his death, from a fit, in 1438.

References

See also
 History of Laos

Kings of Lan Xang
Year of birth unknown
1438 deaths
15th-century Laotian people
15th-century monarchs in Asia
Laotian Theravada Buddhists